The 1963 Campeonato Ecuatoriano de Fútbol was the 5th national championship for football teams in Ecuador. Barcelona won their second national title.

Qualified teams
Eleven teams qualified to compete in this season's tournament: four from the professional leagues of Quito and Guayaquil, two from Tungurahua, and one from Manabí.

First stage

Group A

Standings

Results

Group B

Standings

Results

Final stage

Standings

Results

References

External links
Official website 

1963
Football
1963 in South American football leagues